Mount Drewry is a prominent blocklike mountain on the west side of Beardmore Glacier, rising to  between Bingley Glacier and Cherry Icefall in the Queen Alexandra Range. It was discovered and roughly mapped by the Southern Journey Party of the British Antarctic Expedition, 1907–09, led by Ernest Shackleton, which was abreast of this mountain on 13 December 1908. It was named by the Advisory Committee on Antarctic Names in 1986 after David J. Drewry, a British glaciologist who was a leader of the Scott Polar Research Institute – National Science Foundation – Technical University of Denmark airborne radio echo sounding program, 1967–79, Director of the Scott Polar Research Institute, 1984–87, and Director of the British Antarctic Survey, from 1987.

References 

Mountains of the Ross Dependency
Shackleton Coast